Pranav Sachdev is an Indian actor. He is primarily known for his work on national television and online.

He is an alumnus of Modern School, which is also where he commenced his journey of theatre, he later secured admission in Hans Raj College through the dramatics quota.

Sachdev co-runs a production house named LCM Entertainment, through which he has produced celebrity stage productions and creatively headed various web advertisements and fictional series.

Personal life
Sachdev was born in Delhi and grew up with his younger brother and their parents Simi Sachdev and Bharat Sachdev. His father, himself a lawyer, made sure that he completed his LLB from Mumbai University before going into show business.

Career
Sachdev began his career as a child actor in the TV show Intehaa, broadcast on Doordarshan. This was followed by a TV film called Lathi. Later, he acted in various professionally staged plays under the guidance of the theatre veteran Raj Upadhyay and was cast as the lead in the TV show Zindagi Dot Com',' directed by Umesh Bist.

Sachdev has appeared in numerous commercials for brands like Dabur and Hyundai and has acted in plays starring acting legends including Asrani and Tom Alter.

In Digital Arena, he has played a lead role in Hadh- a web original by Vikram Bhatt for Sony Liv, and Dilliwood, a web original for the Times Internet. 
He is currently shooting for Unafraid'', a crime thriller directed by Vikram Bhatt.

Television

Web series

Stage shows

References

Living people
Indian male television actors
1992 births